Clairvoyant was a  Mutin-class 14-gun cutter of the French Navy.

Career 
In 1781, Clairvoyant sailed with the division under Suffren up to Cap Vert.  In 1782, she was reconfigured as a brig. 

Clairvoyant took part in the Battle of the Saintes on 12 April 1782. 

In 1785, she was wrecked at Audierne. The crew was saved.

Citations and references 
Citations

References
 
  (1671-1870)

Cutters of the French Navy
1780 ships
Ships built in France
Mutin-class cutters